Jennifer Johnston (born July 16, 1954) is an American politician from Alaska. Johnston is a Republican member of the Alaska House of Representatives, representing the 28th District since 2017. She moved to Alaska in 1976, and has served as a small business owner, outdoor educator and public servant. In the 2020 Alaska House of Representatives election, she sought renomination but lost.

Political career
Johnston served three terms in the Anchorage Assembly 

In 2016 she ran for the Alaska House of Representatives to replace retiring Representative Mike Hawker. In the Republican primary, she defeated Ross Beiling. In the general election, she defeated Democrat Shirley Coté.

Personal life
She was born in Danville, Vermont. She is married to Allan Johnston and they have three children.

References

Living people
Republican Party members of the Alaska House of Representatives
21st-century American women politicians
21st-century American politicians
People from Danville, Vermont
1954 births